"Already Dead" is a song by American rapper and singer Juice Wrld. It was released via Grade A Productions through exclusive licensing to Interscope Records as the lead single from his fourth studio album, Fighting Demons, on November 12, 2021. Juice Wrld wrote the song with producers Nick Mira and DT.

Background 
On March 1, 2018, Juice Wrld tweeted "I've been dead for years", which was the first reference to the song. The song was recorded on March 20, 2018, with the beat having been made 2 days prior on March 18, 2018. The song was soon accompanied with two snippets that Juice previewed. Two years later, on December 9, 2020, Juice WRLD's manager Lil Bibby would tweet out to confirm he was looking for the song. 8 months later, in July 2021, other manager Peter Jideonwo would confirm that Bibby has found the song. Three months later, on October 26, 2021, Lil Bibby tweeted that the song would be released on November 12, 2021. The song would go on to leak 3 hours later along with the entire studio session from the night Juice recorded the song. The music video and visualizer was heavily inspired by the anime and manga series, Demon Slayer: Kimetsu no Yaiba.

Composition
On the track, Juice Wrld talks about overcoming mental health struggles, over a minor-key piano melody. The song was produced by Nick Mira and DT, producers who have worked with Juice several times in the past.

Use In Media 
On March 26, 2022, "Already Dead" was added to car radios in the 2017 video game "Fortnite" in the "Beat Box Radio. This is the third Juice Wrld song to be added to the game, with the first being his 2018 breakout hit, "Lucid Dreams" and his 2020 hit "Come and Go" with Marshmello.

Personnel
Credits adapted from Spotify.
Jarad Higgins – vocals, composition
Nick Mira – writer, producer
Dorian "DT" Theus – writer, producer

Charts

Weekly charts

Year-end charts

References

External links 
 

2021 singles
2021 songs
Animated music videos
Juice Wrld songs
Songs written by Juice Wrld
Songs written by Nick Mira